The 2010 season was BEC's 14th season in the top division of Thai football. This article shows statistics of the club's players in the season, and also lists all matches that the club played in the season.

Team kit

Chronological list of events
10 November 2009: The Thai Premier League 2010 season first leg fixtures were announced.
January 2010: BEC announced that they will build an extra stand at the stadium in Nong Jork. The new stand will sit opposite the existing stand and will hold 2000 fans. It is expected to be completed in April
January 2010: BEC announce that they will use the Thephasadin Stadium whilst the Nong Jork ground is expanded.
11 August 2010: BEC Tero Sasana were knocked out of the Thai FA Cup by Nakhon Pathom in the fourth round.
15 September 2010: BEC Tero Sasana were knocked out of the Thai League Cup by Sriracha in the second round due to away goals.
24 October 2010: BEC Tero Sasana finished in 9th place in the Thai Premier League.

Squad

Transfers
In

Out

Results

Thai Premier League

League table

FA Cup

Third round

Fourth round

League Cup

First round

1st Leg

2nd Leg

Second round

1st Leg

2nd Leg

Queen's Cup

References

2010
Bec Tero Sasana